The Kh-45 Molnija "Lightning" was a Soviet hypersonic anti-ship air-to-surface missile project. It was developed as the main armament for ICD "Raduga"'s T-4 missile carrier bomber. The designers were A. Y. Bereznyak, G. K. Samokhvalov and V. A. Larionov.

History 
The Kh-45 was intended to be carried on the Tu-160, but the integration was cancelled in 1976–77. The Kh-45 was cancelled and replaced by a nuclear version of the Kh-55 missile.

Basic tactical and technical characteristics 
The Kh-45 weighed 4,500 kg and was 10.8m long.

See also 
 Kh-90

References

External links 
 X-45 Lightning
 X-45. Description of the design. TTX. Scheme.

Nuclear cruise missiles of the Soviet Union
Abandoned military projects of the Soviet Union
Cold War anti-ship cruise missiles of the Soviet Union
Air-to-surface missiles of the Soviet Union
Hypersonic aircraft